Bird genera
 

Nyctibius is a genus of potoos, nocturnal birds in the family Nyctibiidae.

Etymology 
The genus Nyctibius was introduced in 1816 by the French ornithologist Louis Jean Pierre Vieillot to accommodate a single species, Comte de Buffon's "Le Grande Engoulevent de Cayenne", the great potoo, which thus becomes the type species. The genus name is from Ancient Greek nuktibios  meaning "night-feeding", from nux night and bios "life".

Distribution 
They are found throughout much of Mexico, Central America, South America, and parts of the Caribbean.

Taxonomy 
They are one of two genera in the family, the other being the monotypic genus Phyllaemulor (containing only the rufous potoo). Prior to 2018, they were considered the only extant genus within the Nyctibiidae; however, a study that year found a deep divergence between the rufous potoo and all other species in the genus, leading it to be described in a new genus and expanding the number of genera within the family. This was followed by the International Ornithological Congress in 2022.
The genus Nyctibius contains six species:

References 

Taxa named by Louis Jean Pierre Vieillot